Eleanor Ostman is the former food columnist for the St. Paul Pioneer Press and author of Always on Sunday Revisited and Minnesota Eats Out.

With colleague Ellen Carlson, Ostman won the 1994 James Beard Foundation Journalism Award.

Biography
She is a native of Hibbing, Minnesota and a graduate of Macalester College where she studied journalism.

Career
Ostman’s weekly newspaper column was written from 1968 until 1998 and was called Tested Recipes and it was “ the longest running personal food column in U.S. history.”

Selected publications
Celebrations to Remember co-written with Soile Anderson

References

Living people
Year of birth missing (living people)
People from Hibbing, Minnesota
Macalester College alumni
American food writers
James Beard Foundation Award winners
Women food writers
American women columnists
Writers from Minnesota